LightSurf was a provider of multimedia messaging and interoperability solutions for the wireless industry.  The company was founded in 1998 by tech entrepreneurs Philippe Kahn and Sonia Lee, and was acquired by VeriSign in 2008 and later by telecommunications service provider Syniverse Technologies in late 2009.

History
LightSurf was founded in 1998 by Philippe Kahn and his wife Sonia Lee.

In 2005, the company was acquired by VeriSign. Following a change of corporate strategy and an internal reorganisation, the LightSurf technology and assets were included in the "VeriSign Messaging and Mobile Media" business unit which was subsequently offered for sale by VeriSign in late 2008.  The group was sold to Syniverse Technologies in late 2009.

Products

The company's core technology, the LightSurf 6 Open Standards MMS Platform, was a suite of hosted and managed MMS services that allowed users to capture, view, annotate, and share multimedia messages with any handset or e-mail address, regardless of device, file type, or network operator.

LightSurf's products include the first mobile picture messaging solution in North America (GSM), the first mobile picture messaging solution on a GPRS carrier network, the first commercially deployed inter-carrier MMS solution in North America, the highest volume of picture and video messaging in North America and over 400 million media messages shared on Sprint’s network (powered by LightSurf).

See also 
Philippe Kahn, Founder
 Sonia Lee, Co-Founder

Notes

References 

Companies based in Santa Cruz County, California
Defunct software companies of the United States
Software companies established in 1998
Software companies disestablished in 2009
Software companies based in California